Safetyville, USA is a miniature city that sits on a little over 3 acres of land in Sacramento, California. It is a program that was designed to provide safety education to young children in an interactive manner. The miniature town is complete with tiny versions of the California State Capitol building, municipal building, business buildings, and various streets in Sacramento, California.

Founding
Safetyville, USA is part of the non-profit Safety Center, Inc.'s Children's Safety Program which provides life-saving safety skills and awareness education, and was opened at the Safety Center in 1984. The one-third scale town is complete with real sidewalks, crosswalks, streetlights, a police, fire and sheriff station, and businesses that can be found in any city such as McDonald's and Taco Bell. In June 1998 the Honorary Mayor of Safetyville was Dick Cable. Cable was a professional broadcaster for KXTV and News10 of Sacramento and the first Sacramento broadcaster to win an Emmy award.

Goals
The goal of the Safetyville program is to reduce injury and possible deaths, of children, from preventable accidents. The idea is to provide a hands on, interactive experience, rather than a barrage of information acquired through regular classroom educational methods. A trained volunteer tour guide leads the children, preschool age through the third grade, through the miniature city. The children are taught health and fitness, and a variety of safety skills including fire safety, bicycle safety, how to be a safe pedestrian, electrical safety, stranger danger, and railroad safety. 2009 marked the 25th anniversary of Safetyville, USA., and over 200,000 Northern California children had benefited from the educational experience, offered by the child safety program, up to that point. Approximately 10,000 children tour Safetyville, USA each year.

Hands on experience
The hands on experience at Safetyville includes pushing buttons, and learning to look both ways before crossing the street while using the working street lights and crosswalk lights. Before watching a video at the "fire station" the tour guide engages the children by asking questions and there is a "quiz" after the video. There are many opportunities for questions and answers and for children volunteers to help throughout the tour. Additionally, the children are taught how to make a real 911 call, and they practice dialing the correct number and how they would talk to a 911 operator. They are taught how to "stop, drop, and roll" during the fire safety portion of the session, and they practice the technique on the spot.

Events

Safetyville, USA sponsors many events throughout the year including "Halloween Haunt", "Safetyville Family Health and Safety Expo", "Taste of the Little City", and in October 2012 hosted the annual "Fire Fighter Chili Cook-off". Safetyville has a child 'Mayor of Safetyville' who presides at the "Halloween Haunt" and "Safetyville Family Health and Safety Expo".

Halloween haunt
"Halloween Haunt" is an event hosted to promote a safer Halloween experience. There is face-painting, magic shows, and mazes. The event is suitable for younger children but all ages are welcome. Children can "Trick or Treat" in a secure environment and take part in costume contests, games, and raffles. Safetyville celebrated its 21st "Halloween Haunt" in October 2012.

Family Health and Safety Expo
"Safetyville Family Health and Safety Expo" is a yearly event that provides information about health and child care. It provides information to families about local crisis centers and child immunizations, and teach families how and where to get help if needed. Kids are given gifts throughout the expo that have included items such as coupons to pick up free child ID kits, first aid supplies, pencils, dental hygiene tools, and pedometers.

Taste of the little city
Safetyville celebrated its 12th annual "Taste of the Little City" event in May 2013. The popular event raises funds for Safetyville's activities, features top restaurateurs and vintners from the Sacramento region and nearby Napa Valley, and the California Gold Country, as well as media celebrities.

Birthday celebration
In June 2009 Safetyville celebrated 25 years of educating youngsters about the importance of safety. The celebration was held in combination with the "Family Health and Safety Expo". Birthday cake and ice cream was served, and Safetyville unveiled their new mascot, a dog, clothed in a blue cap and red vest. Scheduled to attend the days events were News10's Darla Givens and Dave Thomson, Trevor Wyatt (Magician), Kovar’s Satori Academy (Martial Arts), and dancers from Granite Bay Dance Connection, along with Jennifer Wood of 96.1 FM.

Sponsorships
Safetyville, USA allows corporations and small businesses to get involved with the program through sponsorship of the miniature buildings. Some of the State and regional organizations represented in Safetyville include the California Highway Patrol, California Department of Motor Vehicles, Sacramento Metro Fire District, Sacramento City Fire Department, Sacramento Police and Sheriff Departments, Arnold Law Firm, and others.

References

Buildings and structures in Sacramento, California
Transport safety
Tourist attractions in Sacramento, California
Child safety
Safety
1984 in California